Zavyalov or Zavialov is a Russian masculine surname, its feminine counterpart is Zavyalova or Zavialova. It may refer to

Alexander Zavyalov (born 1955), Russian skier
Alexander Zavyalov (born 1969), Soviet and Russian ice hockey player
Anatoli Zavyalov (born 1979), Russian football player
Andrei Zavyalov (born 1971), Ukraine-born Turkmenistani football coach and former player
Ekaterina Poistogova (born Zavyalova in 1991), Russian middle-distance runner
Olga Zavyalova (born 1972), Russian cross-country skier
Sergey Zavyalov (born 1958), Russian poet
Vladimir Zavyalov (disambiguation)

See also
Zavyalov Island in the Sea of Okhotsk

Russian-language surnames